Oncinotis glabrata grows as a climbing shrub or liana up to  long, with a stem diameter of up to . Its fragrant flowers feature a yellow to greenish yellow corolla. Habitat is forests from sea-level to  altitude. Local medicinal uses include as a treatment for yaws sores. O. glabrata is found in Guinea, Liberia, Ivory Coast, Ghana, Benin, Nigeria, Cameroon, the Central African Republic, Equatorial Guinea, Gabon, the Republic of Congo, the Democratic Republic of Congo, Burundi, Uganda, Tanzania and Angola.

References

glabrata
Plants used in traditional African medicine
Flora of Africa
Plants described in 1888
Taxa named by Henri Ernest Baillon
Taxa named by Otto Stapf
Taxa named by William Philip Hiern